The 2007 Czech Open was the fifteenth edition of the Czech Open international floorball tournament. It was held in 2007 in Prague, Czech Republic. It was won by SalibandySeura Viikingit (SSV Helsinki), ending a 6-year 'streak' where a Swedish team has won the tournament. No bronze medal match or placement matches were played.

Tournament results

Round Robin

Group A

Group B

Group C

Group D

Seeding matches

Group E
The top two teams from both group A and B are placed into a group where 3 of the 4 teams will qualify to the quarterfinals. Each team plays 2 games at this stage against their other 2 opponents, as they have already played against one of them. The score and points from the other previous games are then carried over and accounted for in group standings. The top 3 teams advance to the quarterfinals, and the 4th team is eliminated from the tournament.

Group F
The top two teams from both group C and D are placed into a group where 3 of the 4 teams will qualify to the quarterfinals. Each team plays 2 games at this stage against their other 2 opponents, as they have already played against one of them. The score and points from the other previous games are then carried over and accounted for in group standings. The top 3 teams advance to the quarterfinals, and the 4th team is eliminated from the tournament.

Group G
Teams in this group are placed into brackets using the A3-B4 and B3-A4 method. The team that wins the group is then placed into the quarterfinal brackets. 3 of the 4 teams are eliminated from the tournament.

Group H
Teams in this group are placed into brackets using the C3-D4 and C3-D4 method. The team that wins the group is then placed into the quarterfinal brackets. 3 of the 4 teams are eliminated from the tournament.

Playoffs

Quarter-finals

Semi-finals

Championship match

Statistics

Standings

References

External links
Official Website

Floorball competitions in the Czech Republic
International floorball competitions
Czech Open, 2007